Brush Strokes is a British television sitcom, broadcast on BBC television from 1986 to 1991.  Written by Esmonde and Larbey and set in south London, it depicted the (mostly) amorous adventures of a wisecracking house painter, Jacko (Karl Howman). There were 40 episodes spread over five series.

Premise
Jacko (Karl Howman) works as a house painter alongside his brother-in-law, Eric (Mike Walling), who was married to Jacko's sister Jean (Nicky Croydon). He lives with his sister and brother-in-law. Jacko also shares an anti-authority humour. In this case the butt of his humour is his boss, Lionel Bainbridge.

Gary Waldhorn played Lionel, and Elizabeth Counsell played his wife, Veronica, who had a crush on Jacko. The Bainbridges had a daughter called Lesley who is a spoiled daddy's girl, and became Jacko's girlfriend during series one. She was played by two actresses during the life of the show: Kim Thomson in the first series and Erika Hoffman from series two onwards. In series one it was hinted that Jacko was somehow indebted to Lionel and working for him after the pair had become involved with some unlawful money-making wheeling-dealing some years prior, for which Jacko almost got caught and was set to stand trial until Lionel used his 'respectable business reputation' to fabricate a story and get him off the hook, leaving Jacko 'indebted' and working for him, against his better wishes, as a result. This history between the pair was several times hinted at during the first series, but was never mentioned from series two onwards.

Jacko is a ladies' man. Much of the humour comes from his attempts at picking up women whilst around town on painting jobs – much to the disdain of his sister, his boss, and his boss's secretary.

Jackie Lye played Sandra, the secretary at work who became Jacko's fiancée in series two (although the wedding never happened – but they still went on the honeymoon, because they'd paid for it). Other familiar faces that have appeared in episodes include Janine Duvitski, Tracie Bennett and Pippa Haywood.

The show is remembered by many for the slow-off-the-mark pub landlord, Elmo Putney (Howard Lew Lewis) who ran the pub where Jacko and friends took their lunch breaks. Elmo's catchphrase instead of swearing was 'Chisel'.  In later episodes, Jacko unsuccessfully started his own company, "Splosh". Later Elmo leaves for Australia to set up another business in Alice Springs – which because of its name he thinks must be near a very large body of water. He became a rich man after his dog discovered opals in Australia, before returning to London, buying Jacko's failing company and turning it into a wine bar, where everything was decorated in pink. Jacko returned to Bainbridge's, where Veronica was now in charge after Lionel's death.  Veronica subsequently begins a new romance and remarried in the final series.   The end of the series sees Jacko walking down the street and flipping a coin to decide who he should end up with, while Sandra and Lesley wait in the wine bar.

Episodes

Series 1 (1986)

Series 2 (1987)

Series 3 (1988–1989)

Series 4 (1990)

Series 5 (1991)

Music
The theme song "Because of You" was written and performed by Dexys Midnight Runners. Released as a single in November 1986, it reached number 13 in the UK Singles Chart.

Other media
Jacko and Elmo also appeared in the 1989 Comic Relief show on BBC1 as a pair of murderous psychopaths.

Brush Strokes is also repeatedly referred to as a running joke in Diane Morgan’s 2018 show Cunk On Britain. (Now part of a larger 2023 Netflix series known as Cunk On Earth).

DVD releases
Brush Strokes was originally released on VHS and DVD via Universal Playback, a subsidiary of Universal Pictures Home Entertainment, in August 2004. The sets were listed as the first and second series, when in fact, it consisted only of the complete first series of thirteen episodes. This became a common occurrence with Universal Playback as the same issues are present with their other titles, such as Last of the Summer Wine. Acorn Media acquired the distribution rights to the series thereafter, releasing in exactly the same format, mistakenly resulting in a complete series of six series instead of the proper five.

References

External links

 Comedy Guide

Brush Strokes at British TV Resources

1980s British sitcoms
1990s British sitcoms
1986 British television series debuts
1991 British television series endings
BBC television sitcoms
English-language television shows